This was the first edition of the tournament.

Jessica Pegula and Taylor Townsend won the title, defeating Jamie Loeb and Rebecca Peterson in the final, 6–4, 6–1.

Seeds

Draw

References
Main Draw

RBC Pro Challenge - Doubles